Most human civilizations – India, Greece, Egypt, Mesopotamia, Rome, and Persia, among others – based their culture on complex systems of astrology, which provided a link between the cosmos with the conditions and events on earth. For these, the astrological practice was not mere divination because it also served as the foundation for their spiritual culture and knowledge-systems used for practical purposes such as the calendar (see Mesoamerican calendrical shamans) and medicine (e.g. I Ching).

Astrological tradition even contributed to the development of astronomy as the study of the skies provided invaluable insights about celestial bodies. For instance, the Ptolemaic astrological tradition has already listed some of the planets in the Solar System and their movements.

The following is an incomplete list of the different traditions, types, systems, methods, applications, and branches of astrology.

By theoretical framework
Heliocentric astrology
Psychological astrology
Sidereal and tropical astrology

By culture (contemporary forms)
Burmese astrology
Chinese astrology
Hindu astrology
Jewish astrology
Tibetan astrology
Western astrology

By time (historical development)
Babylonian astrology ( 1800 –  1200 BCE)
Chinese astrology ( 1050 BCE – present)
Hellenistic astrology (2nd century BCE – 7th century CE)
Hindu astrology (2nd century CE – present)
Western astrology (2nd century CE – present)
Jewish astrology ( 350 CE – present) 
Early Irish astrology (7th – 11th centuries CE)
Islamic astrology (7th century CE – ?)
Heliocentric astrology (1640 - present)
Christian Astrology — a book written in 1647 by the English astrologer William Lilly
Psychological astrology — rooted in the work of psychologist-astrologer Carl Jung, beginning  1920

By type or function

Recent Western developments
Traditions which have arisen relatively recently in the West:
Astrocartography
Cosmobiology
Esoteric astrology
Evolutionary astrology (Steven Forrest)
Financial astrology
Hamburg School of Astrology
Human Design
Sun sign astrology
Synoptical astrology

Relationships with other disciplines and systems of belief
Archaeoastronomy
Alchemy and astrology
Astrology and astronomy
Astrology and the classical elements
Astrology and numerology
Astrology and science
Astrotheology
Christian views on astrology
History of astrology
Islam and astrology
Jewish views on astrology

See also 
Celtic calendar
Geocentric model

References

 
 
Astrology traditions
Traditions